Konstal 105NWr is a Polish tram resulting from the modernization of the tram Konstal 105Na by Protram plants.

Building 
In the process of modernization many things were upgraded for example the tram received new doors and new front and rear plastic walls with rectangular headlights. Currently, in Wrocław, there are 64 trams of this type.

Design 
The tram is not far different from its predecessor Konstal 105Na. The overall exterior design is changed, including the removal of one of the doors in each carriage. The interior differs from tram to tram. This is because the seats were chosen by price and quantity available. Today, the tram is often mistaken as the Protram 204WrAs, since it looks roughly the same. Another tram that is recognized by the people to be a modernized version of the Konstal 105Na is the Protram 205WrAs. By a fact the Protram models are completely different.

Equipment 
Some of the trams are equipped with Air-Conditioning for the driver. The standard are better, mainly plastic seats with textures on them.

Tram vehicles of Poland